"I'm Still Dancin' with You" is a song co-written and recorded by American country music artist Wade Hayes. It was released in March 1995 as the second single from his debut album, Old Enough to Know Better. The song reached number 4 on the Billboard Hot Country Singles & Tracks chart in June 1995. It was written by Hayes and Chick Rains.

Content
The narrator states that even though he is no longer with his former lover, whenever he dances with another person he still thinks of the former lover.

Music video
The music video was directed by Steven Goldmann and premiered in early 1995. It was filmed in Austin, Texas.

Chart performance
"I'm Still Dancin' with You" debuted at number sixty-two on the U.S. Billboard Hot Country Singles & Tracks for the week of March 18, 1995.

Year-end charts

References

Songs about dancing
1995 singles
Wade Hayes songs
Song recordings produced by Don Cook
Columbia Nashville Records singles
Music videos directed by Steven Goldmann
Songs written by Chick Rains
Songs written by Wade Hayes
1995 songs